Jakob Maximilian Schöller (born 9 December 2005) is an Austrian professional footballer who plays as a centre-back for 2. Liga club Admira.

Club career
Seen as one of the best young talents at Admira, where he has played from under-6 level, Schöller signed a new contract with the club in August 2022.

International career
Schöller has represented Austria at youth international level.

Career statistics

Club

Notes

References

2005 births
Living people
Austrian footballers
Austria youth international footballers
Association football defenders
2. Liga (Austria) players
FC Admira Wacker Mödling players